Cretin Crossover is the first album from Hawaii ska punk group Smitz. Taking the best songs from their demo album and their new material compiling into a 17 track release. The album took seven years to finish.

Track listing

 808 Scene – 2:41
 In The Morning – 1:57
 D.O. – 2:44
 Not Your Weapon – 3:11
 Anti-"Love" Song – 3:26
 Julie Was An Anarchist – 3:12
 End Of The Line – 1:55
 Cretin Crossover – 3:01
 Hate Against – 3:12
 Problems In The Nation – 1:53
 I Tried – 1:52
 Medication Drug – 2:16
 Rat Race – 1:53
 Sicker Thought – 2:35
 Pollute Boy – 4:08
 Call To Action – 3:24
 Wooly Wooly – 13:39

Recording details
 Jonny Random – vocals, rhythm guitar
 Kalani Punani – lead guitar, backup vocals, keyboards
 Taylor Rice – bass
 Brennen Widget – drums, tambourine, djembe, cabasa, backup vocals
 Demitri Marmash – Producer
 Jonny Boto – trumpet (tracks 9, 13)
 Evan Lewis (Babyface) – saxophone (tracks 9, 13)
 Geoffrey Siffring – trombone (tracks 9, 13)
 Josh 86 – vocals (track 1) backup vocals

References

"Honolulu Pulse", Island Mele: ‘Cretin Crossover’
"CD Baby",Cretin Crossover
"iTunes"
"Google Play"
"CD Universe"

2012 debut albums
Smitz albums